HotRuby is a JavaScript and ActionScript implementation of the Ruby programming language. HotRuby runs Ruby source code on a web browser and Flash.

References

External links

Project site at Google Code
http://www.rubyinside.com/hotruby-a-javascript-flash-virtual-machine-that-runs-ruby-821.html
http://ejohn.org/blog/ruby-vm-in-javascript/
https://web.archive.org/web/20091005062559/http://www.ntecs.de/blog/articles/2008/03/26/rubyjs-vs-hotruby/

Ruby (programming language)